Units raised in Massachusetts during the American Civil War consisted of 62 regiments of infantry, six regiments of cavalry, 16 batteries of light artillery, four regiments of heavy artillery, two companies of sharpshooters, a handful of unattached battalions and 26 unattached companies. The following is a List of Massachusetts Civil War Units.

Infantry

1st Battalion Massachusetts Volunteer Infantry 
1st Regiment Massachusetts Volunteer Infantry
2nd Regiment Massachusetts Volunteer Infantry
3rd Regiment Massachusetts Volunteer Militia
3rd Battalion Massachusetts Rifles 
4th Regiment Massachusetts Volunteer Militia
4th Battalion Massachusetts Volunteer Militia
5th Regiment Massachusetts Volunteer Militia
6th Regiment Massachusetts Volunteer Militia
7th Regiment Massachusetts Volunteer Infantry
8th Regiment Massachusetts Volunteer Militia 
9th Regiment Massachusetts Volunteer Infantry
10th Regiment Massachusetts Volunteer Infantry
11th Regiment Massachusetts Volunteer Infantry
12th Regiment Massachusetts Volunteer Infantry
13th Regiment Massachusetts Volunteer Infantry
14th Regiment Massachusetts Volunteer Infantry
15th Regiment Massachusetts Volunteer Infantry
16th Regiment Massachusetts Volunteer Infantry
17th Regiment Massachusetts Volunteer Infantry
18th Regiment Massachusetts Volunteer Infantry
19th Regiment Massachusetts Volunteer Infantry
20th Regiment Massachusetts Volunteer Infantry
21st Regiment Massachusetts Volunteer Infantry
22nd Regiment Massachusetts Volunteer Infantry
23rd Regiment Massachusetts Volunteer Infantry
24th Regiment Massachusetts Volunteer Infantry
25th Regiment Massachusetts Volunteer Infantry
26th Regiment Massachusetts Volunteer Infantry
27th Regiment Massachusetts Volunteer Infantry
28th Regiment Massachusetts Volunteer Infantry
29th Regiment Massachusetts Volunteer Infantry
30th Regiment Massachusetts Volunteer Infantry
31st Regiment Massachusetts Volunteer Infantry
32nd Regiment Massachusetts Volunteer Infantry
33rd Regiment Massachusetts Volunteer Infantry
34th Regiment Massachusetts Volunteer Infantry
35th Regiment Massachusetts Volunteer Infantry
36th Regiment Massachusetts Volunteer Infantry
37th Regiment Massachusetts Volunteer Infantry
38th Regiment Massachusetts Volunteer Infantry
39th Regiment Massachusetts Volunteer Infantry
40th Regiment Massachusetts Volunteer Infantry
41st Regiment Massachusetts Volunteer Infantry
42nd Regiment Massachusetts Volunteer Infantry
43rd Regiment Massachusetts Volunteer Infantry
44th Regiment Massachusetts Volunteer Infantry
45th Regiment Massachusetts Volunteer Infantry
46th Regiment Massachusetts Volunteer Infantry
47th Regiment Massachusetts Volunteer Infantry
48th Regiment Massachusetts Volunteer Infantry
49th Regiment Massachusetts Volunteer Infantry
50th Regiment Massachusetts Volunteer Infantry
51st Regiment Massachusetts Volunteer Infantry
52nd Regiment Massachusetts Volunteer Infantry
53rd Regiment Massachusetts Volunteer Infantry
54th Regiment Massachusetts Volunteer Infantry - African-American
55th Regiment Massachusetts Volunteer Infantry - African-American
56th Regiment Massachusetts Volunteer Infantry
57th Regiment Massachusetts Volunteer Infantry
58th Regiment Massachusetts Volunteer Infantry
59th Regiment Massachusetts Volunteer Infantry
60th Regiment Massachusetts Volunteer Infantry
61st Regiment Massachusetts Volunteer Infantry
62nd Regiment Massachusetts Volunteer Infantry
Unattached Companies Massachusetts Volunteer Militia
Boston Cadets 
Salem Cadets

Sharpshooters
1st Company Massachusetts Sharpshooters  
2nd Company Massachusetts Sharpshooters

Cavalry
1st Regiment Massachusetts Volunteer Cavalry
2nd Regiment Massachusetts Volunteer Cavalry
2nd Battalion Massachusetts Volunteer Cavalry
3rd Regiment Massachusetts Volunteer Cavalry
4th Regiment Massachusetts Volunteer Cavalry
5th Regiment Massachusetts Volunteer Cavalry - African-American
Devins' Battalion Mounted Infantry
Independent Battalion of Cavalry

Artillery

Light Artillery
1st Battery, Massachusetts Volunteer Light Artillery
2nd Battery, Massachusetts Volunteer Light Artillery
3rd Battery, Massachusetts Volunteer Light Artillery
4th Battery, Massachusetts Volunteer Light Artillery
5th Battery, Massachusetts Volunteer Light Artillery
6th Battery, Massachusetts Volunteer Light Artillery
7th Battery, Massachusetts Volunteer Light Artillery
8th Battery, Massachusetts Volunteer Light Artillery
9th Battery, Massachusetts Volunteer Light Artillery
10th Battery, Massachusetts Volunteer Light Artillery
11th Battery, Massachusetts Volunteer Light Artillery
12th Battery, Massachusetts Volunteer Light Artillery
13th Battery, Massachusetts Volunteer Light Artillery
14th Battery, Massachusetts Volunteer Light Artillery
15th Battery, Massachusetts Volunteer Light Artillery
16th Battery, Massachusetts Volunteer Light Artillery

Heavy Artillery
1st Battalion Massachusetts Volunteer Heavy Artillery
1st Regiment Massachusetts Volunteer Heavy Artillery
2nd Regiment Massachusetts Volunteer Heavy Artillery
3rd Regiment Massachusetts Volunteer Heavy Artillery
4th Regiment Massachusetts Volunteer Heavy Artillery
1st, 2nd, 4th and 5th Unattached Companies (see: 1st Battalion Massachusetts Heavy Artillery)
3rd, 6th to 16th Unattached Companies (see: 3rd Massachusetts Heavy Artillery)
17th to 28th Unattached Companies (see:4th Massachusetts Heavy Artillery) 
29th Company, Unattached Massachusetts Volunteer Heavy Artillery
30th Company, Unattached Massachusetts Volunteer Heavy Artillery

See also
Lists of American Civil War Regiments by State

Notes

References

External links
 Massachusetts Guard Bibliography a reference bibliography compiled by the United States Army Center of Military History

 
Massachusetts in the American Civil War
Massachusetts
Civil War
Military history of Massachusetts